Yonas Fissahaye (born 6 January 1991) is an Eritrean racing cyclist.

Major results
2010
 5th Overall Tour of Eritrea
2011
 1st Stage 3 Tour of Eritrea
2016
 1st Asmara Circuit
 6th Massawa Circuit
 9th Overall Tour of Eritrea

References

External links

1991 births
Living people
Eritrean male cyclists